The Stars and Stripes Stakes was a Grade III horse race in the United States for Thoroughbreds aged three years and up. It was last raced over a distance of 12 furlongs (1½ miles) on the turf at Arlington Park near Chicago as a lead up race to the Arlington Million and Breeders' Cup Turf.

Inaugurated in 1929, it was raced on dirt through 1949 and again in 1973 and 1974. It was hosted by Washington Park Racetrack from 1943 to 1945 and in 1958 and 1959. It was run for three-year-olds only in 1958.

Until the advent of the Breeders' Cup races, the race was known as the Stars and Stripes Handicap and was an important part of the annual racing calendar. It drew the top horses from across the United States and has been won by a number of U.S. Hall of Fame horses as well as U.S. Triple Crown champion Citation.

Key to Content finished first in 1981 but was disqualified and placed fourth. As a result, Rossi Gold and Ben Fab, who finished in a dead heat for second, were moved up to a dead heat for first.

In 2019 the Stars and Stripes Stakes was dropped from the Arlington Park schedule.

Records
Speed record on turf:
 1:42 1/5 @ 1 1/16 miles: Drumalis (1985)
 1:47 1/5 @ 1 1/8 miles: Round Table (1959) 
 1:55.00  @ 1 3/16 miles: Plate Dancer (1992)
 2:27.39 @ 1 1/2 miles: Dark Cove (2013)

Most wins:
 3 – Rossi Gold (1981, 1982, 1983)

Most wins by a jockey:
 5 – Pat Day (1981, 1982, 1983, 1985, 1989)

Most wins by a trainer:
 5 – Harry Trotsek (1950, 1962, 1972, 1974, 1976)

Most wins by an owner:
 4 – Calumet Farm (Warren Wright) (1947, 1948, 1949, 1955)
 4 – Hasty House Farm (1950, 1962, 1972, 1974)

Winners

References

Arlington Park website

Discontinued horse races
Graded stakes races in the United States
Open middle distance horse races
Turf races in the United States
Arlington Park
Horse racing in Illinois
Recurring sporting events established in 1929
Recurring sporting events disestablished in 2019